Hazara Indonesians or Indonesian Hazaras are Indonesians who have Hazara ancestry. Most of the Hazara Indonesian people live in the Puncak area which is located between Bogor Regency and Cianjur Regency especially Cisarua.

Origins
The Hazara in Indonesia are mostly victims of the conflict in Afghanistan who fled from ethnic and religious persecution by the Taliban. Some Hazaras in Indonesia only stop temporarily before seeking asylum in other countries such as Australia, Malaysia, and Singapore.

The arrival of the Hazara in Indonesia initially came from Jakarta then many of them moved to the Puncak area and then some of them lived and settled and married with local peoples.

Demographics
Just like in their homeland of Afghanistan, the majority of Hazara people in Indonesia also convert to Shi'a Islam. Most of them live in Cisarua and several others are scattered in Batam, Jakarta, Makassar, Medan, Pekanbaru, and Tanjungpinang.

Social conditions
Most Hazara people in Indonesia live in poor conditions, because many of them cannot work and their children are not in school. This is because Indonesia is not a signatory to the UN Refugee Convention.

See also
Hazara diaspora
Hazara Australian
Hazaras in Europe

References

External links

 
Ethnic groups in Afghanistan
Ethnic groups in Indonesia